The Conrad Luft Sr. House, near Sterling, Colorado, was built in 1902.  It was listed on the National Register of Historic Places in 1984.

It is a Queen Anne-style house, apparently built to a pattern book design, with multiple gables, corner cutaways creating semi-octagonal rooms, and other details, some details being derivative of Colonial Revival style.

The front porch rebuilt then reflects further Colonial Revival styling.

It was unusual at its listing for having exterior and interior colors still repeating original colors.

It was built by the Hoffman Brothers (carpenters) to serve as their own residence.

References

National Register of Historic Places in Logan County, Colorado
Queen Anne architecture in Colorado
Houses completed in 1902
Sterling, Colorado
Houses in Logan County, Colorado